A cryptogram is a short, coded text.

Cryptogram may also refer to:
 The Cryptogram, a play by David Mamet
 Cryptograms, a studio album by Deerhunter
 A newsletter published by Bruce Schneier
 A journal published by the American Cryptogram Association
 The cryptogram a novel by James De Mille

See also
 Cryptograph, a former Swedish company
 Cryptogam, a type of plant
 Cryptogramma, a genus of ferns